Ottoman Siyaq Numbers is a Unicode block containing a specialized subset of the Arabic script that was used for accounting in Ottoman Turkish documents.

Block

History
The following Unicode-related documents record the purpose and process of defining specific characters in the Ottoman Siyaq Numbers block:

References 

Unicode blocks